Graeme Pierre Le Saux (born 17 October 1968) is an English former professional footballer and television pundit.

As a versatile left sided player he played most of his career at left back with two spells at Chelsea, Blackburn Rovers, Southampton, and for the England national football team.

Le Saux started his career in his native Jersey before moving to England when he signed for Chelsea in 1987. He made his debut in 1989 and played initially as a left winger before transitioning to an attacking fullback role for the club. He left Chelsea in 1993 to join the newly promoted Blackburn side being built by wealthy benefactor Jack Walker and was a regular fixture in their 1994–95 Premier League winning side. In 1997, he became the most expensive defender in English footballing history when he returned to Chelsea for £5 million, staying there for six seasons before finishing his career with a move to Southampton in 2003. He announced his retirement from football upon Southampton's relegation from the Premier League in 2005.

In his club playing career, he scored 20 goals from 403 club appearances. He was twice named in the Professional Footballers' Association Team of the Year, in 1995 with Blackburn and in 1998 with Chelsea. As an England international, he made 36 senior appearances from 1994 until 2000, including starting all four England games at the 1998 FIFA World Cup in France, and scoring one international goal, against Brazil.

Club career

Chelsea
Le Saux started his career at St. Paul's of Jersey before moving to Chelsea in December 1987 after being spotted playing in a local tournament by manager John Hollins. He made his debut for the club two years later against Portsmouth and had become a regular by the 1990–91 season. His first stint at Chelsea ended in controversy, though. Angry at continually being substituted, he snapped when he was subbed again during a match with Southampton and threw his shirt to the ground as he stormed past manager Ian Porterfield. He was sold to Blackburn Rovers in March 1993 for £700,000.

Blackburn Rovers
Le Saux arrived at Blackburn as part of wealthy benefactor Jack Walker and manager Kenny Dalglish's plan to establish the club as one of the country's top sides, and joined an impressive side containing the likes of Alan Shearer and Tim Flowers. Blackburn finished second in Le Saux's first full season, and were crowned Premier League champions a year later, with Le Saux a near ever-present. He missed the second half of the following season due to a broken ankle which also ruled him out of Euro 96, but was still caught up in controversy after fighting with teammate David Batty during a UEFA Champions League tie with Spartak Moscow.

Return to Chelsea
In August 1997, Le Saux became the most expensive defender in English football when he returned to Chelsea in a £5 million deal. Always a regular when available, Le Saux's second spell with Chelsea was often interrupted by injury or suspension. He remained there for six seasons, and was an important part of the side which won the League Cup and Cup Winners' Cup in 1998 and the FA Cup in 2000, though he missed the latter two of those finals through injury.

Southampton
He was swapped in a part-exchange deal with Southampton for Wayne Bridge in 2003. Le Saux played for another two seasons before announcing his retirement in May 2005 following Southampton's relegation from the Premiership. He scored two goals for Southampton, scoring once in the league against Norwich City and once in the League Cup against Bristol City.

Wembley
In June 2012, he was one of several former professional footballers who agreed to join Wembley to play in their FA Cup campaign for the new season. Le Saux and fellow former-internationals Ray Parlour, Martin Keown, Claudio Caniggia and Brian McBride, plus David Seaman (goalkeeping coach) and former England manager Terry Venables (technical advisor), came out of retirement to play for Wembley who were featured in a television documentary as they attempted to help the club play at Wembley Stadium. Wembley were knocked out in a replay by Uxbridge after initially setting up the tie by knocking Langford out in the previous round.

International career
Le Saux was capped 36 times for England. He made his first appearance in a friendly win over Denmark and played at the 1998 World Cup, appearing in every game as England reached the second round. He was injured for Euro 96 and Euro 2000. Le Saux's only international goal came against Brazil on 11 June 1995 in the Umbro Cup, with a powerful shot from outside the penalty area. It came 18th in a poll of the greatest ever England goals.

Personal life
Le Saux is of English descent through his mother, and has distant Breton descent on his father's side.

Homophobic abuse

Le Saux is heterosexual, and he and his wife, Mariana, have two children. Despite this, rumours that he was homosexual circulated throughout his career after he said that he had spent a summer holiday with one of his Chelsea teammates, Ken Monkou. He attributed this to his lack of enthusiasm for the "typical" footballer's lifestyle, his university background, and the fact that he read a left-wing broadsheet newspaper, The Guardian.

This led to abuse from opposition fans and even players. He was involved in a running series of taunts with Liverpool striker Robbie Fowler while playing for Chelsea against Liverpool on 27 February 1999. During the game, Fowler repeatedly bent over and pointed his backside in Le Saux's direction. Le Saux delayed taking a free-kick to protest about Fowler's behaviour and was booked for time wasting. Fowler claimed in an autobiography that at one point during the match, Le Saux shouted "But I'm married!", which was followed up by Fowler's quip "So was Elton John, mate!" Le Saux himself said that this never happened, and that Fowler had used 'dramatic licence' to make himself look funny. The referee did not take any action against Fowler. Unseen by the match officials, Le Saux later struck Fowler on the edge of the Chelsea penalty area. Both were later charged with misconduct by the FA. In a later interview with The Times, Le Saux said, "More than anything in my career, that offended me. What [Fowler] did was wrong and he has never admitted that. He still talks as if it was a bit of a laugh".

Following Thomas Hitzlsperger's disclosure that he was gay in January 2014, Le Saux's article from 2007 resurfaced on social media, causing Fowler to state on Twitter that he had apologised to Le Saux.

In his 2007 autobiography, Le Saux also accused Chelsea's assistant manager Gwyn Williams of making homophobic comments towards him. "He would wander up to me before training and say: 'Come on, poof, get your boots on.'"

Education
Le Saux took an Environmental Studies degree at Kingston University before dropping out to concentrate on his football career. His interest in learning never left him, however, and as a player he was often derided for reading The Guardian and visiting museums in his spare time.

After football
Following his retirement he worked as a pundit for the BBC on both their Match of the Day 2 television highlights show, and for their BBC Radio 5 Live station. He currently works as a match analyst and commentator for the U.S.-based NBC Sports Network's television coverage of the Premier League.

In other television appearances, in 2007 Le Saux was a finalist on the game show Vernon Kay's Gameshow Marathon and in 2009 he competed in series 4 of the talent show Dancing on Ice, being voted off in the first round. Le Saux has reported and presented occasionally for BBC Two's business news programme Working Lunch, while in 2006, he joined ABN AMRO Bank's UK private banking team in the role of Ambassador for their Sports Desk. Le Saux is a trustee of the UK charity Fields in Trust

Le Saux published his autobiography Left Field: A Footballer Apart in September 2007.

He is currently a non-executive director of RCD Mallorca after the club were bought by American investor Robert Sarver and former NBA player Steve Nash in January 2016.

Career statistics

Club

International

Scores and results list England's goal tally first, score column indicates score after each Le Saux goal.

Honours
Chelsea
Football League Cup: 1997–98
FA Charity Shield: 2000
Football League Second Division: 1988–89
UEFA Cup Winners' Cup: 1997–98
UEFA Super Cup: 1998

Blackburn Rovers
Premier League: 1994–95

Jersey
Muratti Vase: 1987

Individual
PFA Team of the Year: 1994–95 Premier League, 1997–98 Premier League

See also
 List of England international footballers born outside England

References

External links

1968 births
Living people
English people of French descent
English people of Breton descent
Jersey footballers
English footballers
Association football wingers
Association football fullbacks
Alumni of Kingston University
Chelsea F.C. players
Blackburn Rovers F.C. players
Southampton F.C. players
Wembley F.C. players
English Football League players
Premier League players
England under-21 international footballers
England B international footballers
England international footballers
1998 FIFA World Cup players
FA Cup Final players